Albidiferax is a genus in the phylum Pseudomonadota (Bacteria).

Etymology
The name Albidiferax derives from:Latin adjective albidus, whitish, white; Latin adjective ferax, fertile; New Latin masculine gender noun Albidiferax, whitish and fertile.

Species
The genus contains a single species, namely Albidiferax ferrireducens ( corrig. (Finneran et al. 2003) Ramana and Sasikala 2009,  (Type species of the genus).; Latin noun ferrum, iron; Latin participle adjective reducens (from Latin v. reducere), leading back, bringing back and in chemistry converting to a different oxidation state; New Latin participle adjective ferrireducens, iron-reducing (converting iron to a reduced oxidation state).)

See also
 Bacterial taxonomy
 Microbiology

References

Comamonadaceae
Monotypic bacteria genera
Bacteria genera